Geriatrics may refer to two journals:

Geriatrics (Advanstar Communications journal), published from 1946 to 2009 by Advanstar Communications. The journal absorbed Patient Care in 2007.

Geriatrics (MDPI journal), abbreviated Geriatrics (Basel), published by MDPI